This is a list of museums in the Bahamas.

New Providence
 Bahamas Historical Society Museum
 National Art Gallery of The Bahamas
 Nassau Public Library and Museum
 San Damon Museum
 Pompey Museum of Slavery & Emancipation
 Balcony House Museum
 Fort Charlotte
 Heritage Museum of the Bahamas
 Junkanoo World Museum & Arts Centre
 Pirates of Nassau

Out Islands
 Bimini Museum
 Dolphin House Museum
 Long Island Museum
 Man-O-War Heritage Museum
 Spanish Wells Museum
 Wyannie Malone Museum

See also 
 List of museums by country

Bahamas
 
Museums
Bahamas
Museums